The Vulcanair VF600W Mission is an Italian single-engined utility transport, under development by Vulcanair of Casoria.

Design and development
The Mission is based on the twin-engined Vulcanair Canguro but powered by a single Walter M601F-11 turboprop driving a five-bladed Avia propeller. It is a high-wing braced monoplane with a fixed tricycle landing gear and has seating for 10 to 16 passengers.

The prototype first flew on 4 December 2002. The aircraft was damaged in an incident at Casandrino on 19 December 2003.

In September 2006 VulcanAir's director of sales stated the VF600W was still an active programme, despite delays and a lack of company resources. He indicated that the aircraft was expected to resume test flying in August 2006 after which the company would provide a new estimate of when it would be certified.

In March 2019 the aircraft was not listed on the company website and no company updates had been released.

Specifications (performance estimated)

References

Notes

Sources

Mission
2000s Italian civil utility aircraft
Single-engined tractor aircraft
High-wing aircraft
Single-engined turboprop aircraft
Aircraft first flown in 2002